Lupukngna was a coastal Tongva village that was at least 3,000 years old located on the bluffs along the Santa Ana River in Huntington Beach near the Newland House Museum. Other nearby coastal villages included Genga, located in West Newport Beach, and Moyongna, located down the coast near Corona del Mar. The village has also been referred to as Lukup and Lukupa. The village has been chronicled in the history of Costa Mesa, California.

History 

As a coastal village, the usage of te'aats were likely important to the village's people. In the late eighteenth century, padres from Mission San Juan Capistrano reportedly visited the village as part of a colonial project of Christian conversion at Spanish Missions in California. 

The Diego Sepúlveda Adobe was built overlooking Lupukngna and Genga from between 1817-1823 as an outpost "to watch over cattle and Indians." In 1827, missionaries considered whether to move their entire operation to the location. 

In 1935, archaeologists found evidence of a village along the Santa Ana River near contemporary Adams Avenue. It was found that villagers primarily subsisted on acorns, seeds, berries, small game, fish and shellfish, similar to surrounding Tongva villages. Shell mounds were also found.

The Newland House Museum was identified as a likely site of the village. This is because the house was constructed on one of a few knolls in the area that rises above the Santa Ana River's floodplain. Numerous Tongva villages in the area were established on other similar knolls, making the location more probable. Additionally, several archaeological investigations have been done at the house since the 1930s, which have yielded various Tongva artifacts.

A small residential street in Costa Mesa near the Diego Sepúlveda Adobe is named Lukup Lane in reference to the village.

See also 
Native American villages in Orange County, California:

 Acjacheme
 Ahunx
 Alauna
 Genga
 Hutuknga
 Moyongna
 Pajbenga
 Piwiva
 Puhú
 Putiidhem
 Totpavit

References 

Tongva populated places
Former Native American populated places in California
History of Orange County, California
Costa Mesa, California
Huntington Beach, California
California Mission Indians